Cláudio Bomfim de Castro e Silva (born 29 March 1979)  is a Brazilian lawyer and politician, former Vice Governor of Rio de Janeiro, who assumed his duties and powers as Acting Governor since the suspension of governor Wilson Witzel and current Governor of the state since Witzel's impeachment. Member of the Social Christian Party (PSC), according to historical data, he is the second youngest Vice Governor of the state in history, behind only of Roberto Silveira, who was elected at the age of 32 in the 1950s. However, he's the youngest to be elected in the state since the redemocratization.

Biography
He moved to Rio de Janeiro as a child. In 2005, Castro graduated in Law at Federal University of Rio de Janeiro (UFRJ). He is married and father of two children. Castro is a Roman Catholic singer and musician.

Political experience
In 2004, he began his political history as chief of staff of former City Councillor Márcio Pacheco, who he followed to the Legislative Assembly of Rio de Janeiro until 2016, also as chief of staff. In his office, led the organization of political projects in the defense of life, of children and teenagers in situation of risk, of people with disabilities and fight against drugs.

Cláudio Castro was also special advisor of the Municipal Secretariat of People with Disabilities. In 2013, worked as special advisor in the Chamber of Deputies, in Brasília.

In 2016, Castro was elected to the Municipal Chamber with 10,262 votes, being the 56th most voted candidate. It came after a first unsuccessful try in 2012, when he received 8,298 votes.

On 6 August 2018, the Social Christian Party (PSC) confirmed that City Councillor Cláudio Castro would be a candidate for Vice Governor of Rio de Janeiro along with federal judge Wilson Witzel, and that the party would not form any coalition.

With 59.87% (4,675,355) of the valid votes, Witzel and Castro were elected on 28 October 2018 for a four-year term, which began on 1 January 2019.

Castro was sworn in as Governor of Rio de Janeiro, after Wilson Witzel's impeachment May 1, 2021. On 26 May 2021, Castro joined the Liberal Party.

References

External links
 

|-

|-

1979 births
Living people
People from Santos, São Paulo
Vice Governors of Rio de Janeiro (state)
Governors of Rio de Janeiro (state)
São Paulo (state) politicians
Social Christian Party (Brazil) politicians
Brazilian Roman Catholic singers
Brazilian gospel singers
Brazilian Roman Catholics